Mladen Dodić (born 17 October 1969) is a Serbian football manager and former player.

Playing career
After starting out at Borac Bivolje, Dodić joined Napredak Kruševac in 1990. He spent seven seasons with the club, before moving to Železnik in 1996. Two years later, Dodić returned to Napredak Kruševac. In September 2001, Dodić moved abroad and signed with Maltese side Pietà Hotspurs. He was released the next month, having played just one match for the club.

Managerial career
Dodić was manager of numerous Serbian SuperLiga and Serbian First League clubs, including Napredak Kruševac (three spells), Novi Pazar (three spells), Jagodina (two spells), Javor Ivanjica (two spells), Dinamo Vranje, Borac Čačak and Radnik Surdulica.

In December 2014, Dodić was appointed manager of the Serbia national under-21 team, succeeding Radovan Ćurčić, who took over Serbia's senior national team the month prior.

Career statistics

References

External links
 
 

Association football midfielders
Expatriate football managers in Bulgaria
Expatriate footballers in Malta
FC Lokomotiv 1929 Sofia managers
First League of Serbia and Montenegro players
FK Borac Čačak managers
FK Jagodina managers
FK Javor Ivanjica managers
FK Napredak Kruševac managers
FK Napredak Kruševac players
FK Novi Pazar managers
FK Železnik players
Kosovo Serbs
Maltese Premier League players
Pietà Hotspurs F.C. players
Second League of Serbia and Montenegro players
Serbia and Montenegro expatriate footballers
Serbia and Montenegro footballers
Serbia national under-21 football team managers
Serbian expatriate football managers
Serbian expatriate sportspeople in Bulgaria
Serbian football managers
Serbian footballers
Serbian SuperLiga managers
Sportspeople from Gjakova
Yugoslav footballers
Yugoslav Second League players
1969 births
Living people